Ascospora ruborum is a species of anamorphic ascomycete fungus. It is a plant pathogen that causes cane spot and dieback of raspberry and dewberry.

References

Fungi described in 1894
Fungal plant pathogens and diseases
Small fruit diseases
Ascomycota enigmatic taxa